Jaat Ki Jugni - Ek Visphotak Prem Kahaani- A Man's Woman- An explosive love story) of a rustic Jat guy from Haryana with a shy Jat girl, is an Indian television show, which premiered on 3 April 2017 on Sony Entertainment Television (India). It stars Vishal Vashishtha, Madirakshi Mundle, Rinku Karmarkar, Yash Tonk, Richa Soni and Rakesh Pandey.

The show was rumoured to be  based on the story of Karishma Kapoor and Daggubati Venkatesh starrer 1993 Hindi film Anari which is again a remake of 1991 Tamil film Chinna Thambi.

Vishal Vashishtha and Madirakshi Mundle play the lead roles.

Plot

Love stories of Jat tribe, like Heer Ranjha, Sohni Mahiwal and Mirza Sahiban are considered legendary for showcasing the passion, the pain and the eventual separation of lovers. But this very notion of unhappy endings is what the protagonist Bittu disagrees with. Representing the rebellious nature of today's youth, he wants to change the popular belief with his own, that every love story must have a happy ending only.

While on the other side of the spectrum is Munni, who lives in the shadows of her brothers. A life which is highly protected, make believe and devoid of any men. When the path of the typical independent carefree fearless Jat boy Bittu crosses with timid and shy Jat girl Munni, there is bound to be firework, thus making Jaat Ki Jugni, a Visphotak Prem Kahani (an explosive love story).

Cast

 Vishal Vashishtha as Bittu Singh Dahiya 
 Madirakshi Mundle as Munni Singh Ahlawat/Munni Bittu Singh Dahiya 
 Yash Tonk as Chaudhary Gajender Singh Ahlawat (Munni's elder brother) 
 Richa Soni as Savita Gajender Singh Ahlawat
 Deepali Muchrikar as Muskaan Pratap Singh Ahlawat
 Aarya Dharamchand Kumar as Pratap Singh Ahlawat
 Rakesh Pandey as Khazan Singh Dahiya (Bittu's grandfather)
 Sagar Saini as Masterji/Daljeet Singh Dahiya (Bittu's Father)
 Rinku Karmarkar as Phool Kumari Dahiya (Bittu's mother)
 Amit Pachori as Bhim Singh Ahlawat
 Ashmyrrah Singhh as Sunaina Bhim Singh Ahlawat
 Barkha Singh as Jyoti (Munni's cousin)
 Paaras Madaan as Dr.Vikram (Jyoti's Lover)

References

External links
 
 Jaat Status 
 Jaat image 

2017 Indian television series debuts
2017 Indian television series endings
Hindi-language television shows
Indian drama television series
Sony Entertainment Television original programming
Television shows set in Punjab, India
Television shows set in Haryana
Jat